Gem Tower Defense is a tower defense video game created by Bryan K. It was released on February 18, 2007, under the tower defense subsection of Blizzard's Warcraft III: The Frozen Throne minigames. Several game clients, Flash browser game websites and mobile devices have hosted variants of the game. The game is based upon strategy, mazing, decision making and chance. The goal of the game is to eliminate computer-controlled enemies that follow a set path to reach the end of a pathway. "Gems" are structures players build to defend their maze. Each Gem is randomly distributed leaving it to chance for a player to acquire the one needed. Gems are placed to form a maze for extending the length each enemy unit travels thereby increasing the attack time of the Gems. Both the type and quality of the Gems selected determine the damage and use of the structure.

History
The first Gem Tower Defense sprung from Blizzard's Warcraft game client under the name [BK's] Gem TD v1.4 featuring 42 levels, unique combinable buildings, multiplayer gameplay and an open map for players to explore. Under the "Tower Defense" genre, it is also known as Gem TD. It was not until June 24, 2007, that the game received its own top downloads, capping at 146,057 in v3.1. It maintained the 42 levels but brought the total towers/structures obtainable to 92 and included bosses which are enemy units with superior health. The concept diversified into a flash adaption/imitation producing a browser playable variant. Multiple replication of the game have popped out from minigame supported multiplayer games and devices such as Dota 2 Reborn, Blizzard's StarCraft II, Windows and iOS.

Concept
Gem Tower Defense is a tower defense game built on planning and chance. The goal of the game is to prevent computer-controlled enemies from reaching the end of a path. Players start by placing five random Gems on the map and then choosing one to keep. The Gems are distributed by random with the attributes of type and quality. The type of gem determines what the gem does and the quality represents its strength. The chosen gem has the ability to damage enemy units while the remaining four Gems become rocks. Rocks and Gems block enemy units, whereby a row of rocks and Gems form a wall to redirect the enemy. Enemy units enter in groups, known as waves, traveling through checkpoints before reaching the end of the pathway. The checkpoints on the path are alterable by players to give giving Gems more time to attack. The bounty from defeating each wave allows players to purchase Gem upgrades, unlocking possibilities for players to obtain higher quality gems. Additionally, Gems already on the map can be combined into special gems. These special Gems have unique abilities that are used for various waves.

Strategy
The concept of Gem Tower Defense is to efficiently use mazes, Gems, and planning to win the game. Common mazes revolve around the center and utilizes the waypoints to create the longest possible path for enemy units to travel from start to finish. Upgrading Gem chances set opportunities of getting higher tier Gems easier, but may hinder the ability to get special combinations. The highest quality Gems are not a logical choice when lower tier alternatives are needed to make special Gems.

Gameplay

Gem 
Gem Tower Defense employs the use of eight basic Gems:

Gem Quality
Each Gem has six different qualities, only five of which can be built. Players start with a 100% chance of obtaining the lowest tier gems, then move on to unlocking other chance levels: 

Upgrading chances increases the odds to attain a higher quality Gem. Each Gem and quality of the Gem will determine the strength and use of it, whereby higher tier Gems are stronger than lower tier ones.

Upgrading and Downgrading
With two of the same Gem's type and quality, a player can then choose to combine a lower tier Gem into the next level. Building four of the same Gem allows the player to skip ahead and upgrade to the following Gem quality. The order of level goes from chipped, flawed, normal, flawless, perfect to great. The great type Gems can only be upgraded into and not obtained through direct construction.

Downgrading Gems of a higher quality to a lower tier is a strategic move to obtain specific gems for combinations of special Gems.

Combination
A player can obtain special structures by merging his or her Gems that are in play:

Enemies

Before each wave of enemy units spawn, the type(s) of enemy unit are announced for the players to prepare. All the units in the same wave will have identical details based upon the tower defense norms:
 Health accounts for the overall damage it can receive.
 Armor determines damage type it neglects or reduces.
 Movement Speed or MS is the base speed a unit moves across the path.
 Ground or Air whereby a ground unit is limited to the paths set by the player's structures or maze and an air unit can pass through/above it.
Boss units appear alone but they have more durability than normal units.

The leftover health from enemy units that reach the end of the map determines the damage to the player's in-game health of 100%.

Maze

Building a maze with Gems and rocks are a key element of the game. The game begins with an empty map with a start, end and 5 to 6 checkpoints (depending on the version of the game), where opposing units maneuver through sequentially. Gems and rocks redirect enemy units by blocking the direct path. Mazing does not affect flying units which comes every four rounds and cannot be used to completely block off checkpoints from enemy units.

References

Tower defense video games
2007 video games